Allister John Scott (born 24 June 1971) is a former Australian rules footballer who played with Richmond in the Australian Football League (AFL).

Scott played his early football at Inverloch-Kongwak and Scotch College.

He was selected by Richmond with pick 13 in the 1989 VFL Draft.

In his four season career at Richmond, Scott played 19 senior AFL games. He kicked all of his nine career goals in the 1991 season.

References

External links
 
 

1971 births
Australian rules footballers from Victoria (Australia)
Richmond Football Club players
People educated at Scotch College, Melbourne
Living people